Booneua Prasertsuwan, also spelled  Boon-eau Prasertsuwan, (13 April 1919 – 13 October 2016) was a Thai politician from Suphan Buri Province. Prasertsuwan was first elected to the national House of Representatives in 1957 and won election to the House for 10 consecutive elections from 1957 to 1996. He served as Speaker of the House of Representatives of Thailand from 1995 to 1996. He is credited with persuading Banharn Silpa-archa, the former Prime Minister of Thailand from 1995 to 1996, to enter politics.

Biography
Prasertsuwan was born in Bang Pla Ma District, Suphan Buri Province, on 13 April 1919, to parents, Chuang (mother) and Lang (father) Suwanhong. In 1937, he became a teacher at the Kannasut Sueksalai in his native Suphan Buri Province. He later completed his studies at military medical school and became a Thai Army sergeant. Following the end of World War II, Prasertsuwan became a medical instructor at the Ananda Mahidol Hospital in Lopburi before resigning from his position in 1946 to open a family-run medical clinic.

Prasertsuwan entered politics at the local, provincial level. He was elected to the Suphan Buri provincial council, representing Bang Pla Ma district, four times.

In 1957, he was elected to the House of Representatives of Thailand. He won election to the House of Representatives in ten elections from 1957 to 1996. In 1975, Prasertsuwan joined the Democrat Party, but later switched to the Thamsangkhom and the now defunct Thai Nation Party (or Chart Thai Party).

In 1981, Prasertsuwan was appointed Deputy Agriculture and Cooperative Minister in a government of Prime Minister Prem Tinsulanonda to replace the late Pol Col Krit Sangkhasap, who had died in a 1981 helicopter accident in Chiang Mai while in office. Chatichai Choonhavan, the Prime Minister from 1988 to 1991, also appointed Prasertsuwan as his Office Minister and Deputy Prime Minister during his government.

Prasertsuwan was elected Speaker of the House of Representatives of Thailand in 1995, a position he held until September 1996.

In 1997, he was named to the rank of major general in a special case.

Booneua Prasertsuwan, who was 97 years old, died at Siriraj Hospital in Bangkok on 13 October 2016, the same day as the passing of the King of Thailand, Bhumibol Adulyadej. Prasertsuwan was married to Duangnet Prasertsuwan; the couple had one son, Nathawut Prasertsuwan, a politician and former MP for Suphan Buri Province.

Royal decorations
Booneua has received the following royal decorations in the Honours System of Thailand:
  Knight Grand Cordon (Special Class) of the Most Exalted Order of the White Elephant
  Knight Grand Cordon (Special Class) of The Most Noble Order of the Crown of Thailand

References

1919 births
2016 deaths
Booneua Prasertsuwan
Booneua Prasertsuwan
Booneua Prasertsuwan
Booneua Prasertsuwan
Booneua Prasertsuwan
Booneua Prasertsuwan
Booneua Prasertsuwan
Booneua Prasertsuwan
Booneua Prasertsuwan
Booneua Prasertsuwan
Booneua Prasertsuwan
Booneua Prasertsuwan